N.Flying (Japanese: エヌフライング; short for New Flying which also means 'new wings' or 'new escape') is a South Korean rap rock band formed by FNC Entertainment in 2013. The group released its first digital indie single "Basket" in Japan on October 1, 2013 with the four-member line-up of Kwon Kwang-jin, Lee Seung-hyub, Cha Hun and Kim Jae-hyun. The group officially debut in Korea on May 20, 2015, with the EP Awesome. A fifth member, Yoo Hwe-seung was added to the band in June 2017. Kwang-jin left the group on December 26, 2018, and was replaced by Seo Dong-sung on January 1, 2020.

History

Pre-debut 
In 2009, Kwon Kwang-jin originally debuted as the bassist of labelmate CNBLUE. However, due to personal circumstances, Kwang-jin left the band in late September. In January 2011, Kwang-jin returned to train under FNC Entertainment meeting trainees Seung-hyub, Jae-hyun and Cha Hun. Prior to the debut of N.Flying, lead vocal Park Rai-On left the band in early 2013 due to mandatory military service in his native country of Singapore. FNC Entertainment subsequently confirmed that his contract was terminated to make way for the group's debut. The remaining trainees would go on to form N.Flying.

In 2013, Lee Seung-hyub appeared in Juniel's music video titled Pretty Boy, playing her love interest she meets at a café.

Yoo Hwe-sung was previously introduced as a male trainee to represent FNC on the Mnet survival show, Produce 101 Season 2. He finished in 39th place and hence did not become a member of the produced boy group, Wanna One.

Seo Dong-sung was previously introduced through survival show d.o.b. (dance or band), as a member of NEOZ Band to competing against trainees in NEOZ Dance (future known as SF9) for the chance to debut as a group, but eventually losing to NEOZ Dance who won the public voting. In May 2017, FNC announced that the NEOZ Band would debut as HONEYST before disbanded two years later.

2013–2014: Japanese debut with Basket, One and Only and delayed debut in Korea 
N.Flying held their first performance at Shibuya CYCLONE on September 28. On October 1, they released their first indie single album titled Basket and performed as the opening act at F.T. Island's 'Replay' Zepp tour. BASKET peaked at number two on Tower Records weekly singles chart, number two on Oricon Indies weekly singles chart and number four on Oricon daily singles chart. The band continued doing live gigs at live clubs and also performed as opening act at CNBLUE's 'One More Time' Arena Tour. On November 14, N.Flying did their first one-man live at Live Space Halot.

On January 1, N.Flying released their second Japanese indie single album titled One and Only. The album hit No.1 on Tower Records chart its second day of release.

They made their first television appearance on the 7th episode of FNC's reality drama, tvN's Cheongdam-dong 111. As a sequel of the show, N.Flying revealed their debut story in March 2014 which aired on the same channel.

On January 29, it was announced that N.Flying had been appointed as the new endorsement model of Buckaroo Jeans. In the final episode of their reality show, 'Cheongdamdong111: N.Flying's Way of Becoming a Star', Seung-hyub was appointed as the leader of N.Flying.

In March, they accompanied labelmate F.T. Island to be their opening act at the latter's Singapore concert.

N.Flying was supposed to make their Korean debut in 2014 but it was delayed after the leader of the band, Seung-hyub, injured his knee in July.

2015–2016: Debut in Korea with Awesome and Lonely 
On May 11, FNC Entertainment launched a teaser homepage for N.Flying's upcoming Korean debut. It is also revealed that their debut EP Awesome will be released on May 20 along with the title song's music video.

On May 12, FNC Entertainment announced that N.Flying will be releasing a Chinese version of Awesome simultaneously with the Korean version on May 20 and Japanese version was planned to be released in August. On May 19, 2015, FNC Entertainment released the music video teaser for Awesome. A day later, FNC Entertainment released the full music video features AOA's Kim Seolhyun as the lead role.

On October 12, FNC Entertainment released mysterious teaser "Lonely 2015.10.22". A day later, FNC Entertainment confirmed that N.Flying would be releasing their first single album, Lonely, on October 22. On October 15, N.Flying released individual member teasers. From October 18 to October 20, N.Flying released teaser music video. On October 20, N.Flying confirmed their first single album track list and released highlight medley. N.Flying's first single album Lonely was released on October 22.

In April 2016, N.Flying performed their debut song Awesome at KCON in Japan.

2017–2018: New member Yoo Hwe-seung, The Real: N.Flying, The Hottest, How Are You?, Fly High Project and Kwangjin's departure
In February 2017, FNC Entertainment announced that the group would undergo member changes before their comeback. On June 19, 2017, it was announced that former Produce 101 Season 2 contestant Yoo Hwe-seung would be joining the group.

On July 23, 2017, FNC Entertainment opened N.Flying's teaser site for their August comeback. The agency released teaser images and videos from July 23 to July 31. On August 2, their second EP The Real: N.Flying with the title track lead single "The Real" was released.

On January 3, 2018, N.Flying released their third EP The Hottest with the lead single "Hot Potato".

On May 16, 2018, they released their fourth EP How Are You?.

N.Flying announced a year-long project, Fly High Project with the aim of introducing more people to the band's potential and music. The members will be participating in the planning and production of the project. On October 26, 2018, they released the track called "Like a Flower".

N.Flying held a concert entitled "N.Flying 1st Livehouse Tour - THE REAL IV" on December 5 and 7 in Japan. Following the concluding of the concert, N.Flying were announced that would be held a Japanese concert "2019 LIVE IN JAPAN -BROTHERHOOD-" in Tokyo on June 7, 2019, to commemorate the release of their first Japanese album Brotherhood.

On December 19, 2018, it was announced that Kwang-jin would voluntarily take a break from the group due to arising allegations of inappropriate behavior online. He later left the group on December 26, 2018.

2019: Breakthrough, Spring Memories, and Yaho 

On January 2, N.Flying remained as a four-member band with their single "Rooftop" through Fly High Project #2. Following the release, their concert series "N.Flying Fly High Project Note 2 2019" was held on January 19 at MUV Hall. "Rooftop" first entered the lower ranks of Korean music charts and soon after there had concluded their promotions on music shows in early March, the song gained sudden popularity and went viral after an anonymous person shared it to an online community. "Rooftop" later went on to first place on all major Korean music charts and topped Gaon's weekly digital chart for two consecutive weeks and its monthly digital chart for the month of March. On March 5, N.Flying winning their first ever music show on The Show, followed by Inkigayo on March 17.

On April 24, N.Flying released their fifth EP Spring Memories with the title track "Spring Memories" through Fly High Project #3. The EP included six songs including their previous tracks, "Like a Flower" and "Rooftop". Following the conjunctions of the project release, a concert series was held, entitled "N.Flying Fly High Project Note 3" on April 29 at MUV Hall. The album debuted at 5th place on Gaon.

In June, N.Flying's first world tour entitled "2019 Live Up All Night" was announced to be held in Bangkok on June 20 and Hong Kong on August 10, and in Paris on September 22.

N.Flying held their solo concert series "N.Flying Fly High Project Note 4" on July 20 at Yes24 Live Hall.

On October 15, N.Flying released their sixth EP Yaho with the lead track "Good Bam". The group held their solo concert series, "N.Flying Fly High Project Note 5" at Haneulyeon Theatre, Busan Cinema Center on November 23 and 24.

2020–present: New member Dong-sung, So, Communication, Man on the Moon, Turbulence and military service
On January 1, 2020, former Honeyst leader and bassist Dong-sung was officially announced to joined the group as bassist through fancafe post by N.flying leader Seung-hyub and later was confirmed by FNC. Dongsung previously joined the group activities since summer 2019 as a supporting member.

N.Flying held their solo concert series "N.Flying Fly High Project Note 6" on February 1 and 2 at Yes24 Live Hall, concluding the Fly High Project that began at the start of 2019.

On June 10, 2020, N.Flying released their seventh EP So, Communication with "Oh Really." serving as the album's lead single.

On July 24, 2020, N.Flying released an animated MV for their special digital single, "Starlight".

N.Flying held a late-night online concert series called "Noob Con", on July 25 and August 2.

On February 19, 2021, all five members renewed their contract with FNC Entertainment.

On June 7, 2021, N.Flying released their first Korean studio album, Man on the Moon with "Moonshot" serving as the album's lead single.

On October 6, 2021, N.Flying released the repackaged version of their first Korean studio album Turbulence, with "Sober" serving as the album's lead single.

On April 6, 2022, N.Flying announced that they would hold a solo concert, "Let's Meet and Talk" as part of the Sangsang Madang Music Trip. The concert was held at the KT&G Sangsang Madang Hongdae Live Hall in Seoul on the 6th and 7th May, 13th to 14th May at the KT&G Sangsang Madang Busan Live Hall, and 20th to 21st May at the KT&G Sangang Madang Chuncheon Sound Hall.

In August 2022, N.Flying held a solo concert "2022 N.Flying LIVE '&CON2'" at YES24 Live Hall in Gwangjin-gu, Seoul for two days, dated on August 6 and 7. The concert on 7 August was broadcast live.

In September 2022, the poster for the eighth EP, Dearest was released through the group's official social media. They made a comeback on October 17, with title song "I Like You".

The group held their first Zepp tour, entitled "N.Flying 2020 ZEPP TOUR "Amnesia"" in Japan. The concert was originally planned to be held in 2020, but was delayed due to COVID-19. They performed at Zepp Haneda, Tokyo on October 9, and Zepp Namba, Osaka on October 11.

On February 2, 2023, the agency confirmed that Cha Hun will enlist in the military on March 20, 2023. After completing basic training, he would be sent to the Army Military Music Unit. 

In the case of Kim Jae-hyun, the agency will notify when the enlistment date is confirmed later.

Members

Current
 Lee Seung-hyub (이승협) – leader, main rapper, lead vocalist, rhythm guitarist and pianist
 Cha Hun (차훈) – lead guitarist, backing vocal
 Kim Jae-hyun (김재현) – drummer, percussionist
 Yoo Hwe-seung (유회승) – main vocalist
 Seo Dong-sung (서동성) – bassist, backing vocal

Former
 Kwon Kwang-jin (권광진) – bassist

Discography 

Korean albums
 Man on the Moon (2021)

Japanese albums
 Brotherhood (2019)

Filmography

Television

 Cheongdam-dong 111 (2014)
 Cheongdam-dong 111: N.Flying's Way of Becoming a Star (2014)
 One Night Study (2015)

Web series 
 Seung-hyub's Summer Camp (2018)
 Seung-hyub's Summer Camp Season 2 (2019)
 Seung-hyub's Winter Camp (2020)
 Seung-hyub's Summer Camp Season 3 (2020)
 Seung-hyub's Fall Camp (2020)
 Seung-hyub's Summer Camp Season 4 (2021)
 Seung-hyub's Fall Camp − Picnic (2021)
 Seung-hyub's Summer Camp Season 5 (2022)

Music videos

Concerts and tours

Headlining tours 

Korean tours
 2018 N.Flying Live 'Summer Feeling (2018)
 THE HOTTEST: N.Flying (2018)
 N.Flying FLY HIGH PROJECT NOTE3. Spring Memories (2019)
 N.Flying FLY HIGH PROJECT NOTE4. Again, Summer (2019)
 N.Flying FLY HIGH PROJECT NOTE.5 Yaho (2019)
 N.Flying FLY HIGH PROJECT NOTE6. FLY HIGH (2020)
 Small Theater Concert: Let's Meet and Have Some Talk (2022)
 &CON − Man on the Moon (2022)
 &CON2 (2022)
 &CON3 (2023)Japan tours N.Flying 1st Livehouse Tour - THE REAL IV (2018)
 N.Flying 2019 LIVE IN JAPAN -BROTHERHOOD- (2019)
 N.Flying 2019 1st Hall Live in Japan (2019)
 N.Flying 2020 ZEPP TOUR "Amnesia" (2022)International tours'''
 2019 N.Flying Live 'UP ALL NIGHT (2019)
 2022 N.Flying Live 'Into The Light''' (2022)
 2023 N.Flying Live USA Tour 'DWUW: Do What You Want (2023)
 2023 N.Flying Live &CON3 in Hong Kong (2023)

Affiliated tours
 2013 FNC Kingdom in Japan − Fantastic & Crazy (2013)
 2014 FNC Kingdom in Japan − Fantastic & Crazy (2014)
 2014 FNC Kingdom in Japan − Starlight (2014)
 2015 FNC Kingdom (2015)
 2016 FNC Kingdom − Creepy Nights (2016)
 2017 FNC Kingdom − Midnight Circus (2017)
 2019 FNC Kingdom − Winter Forest Camp (2019)
 2022 FNC Kingdom − Star Station (2022)

Awards and nominations

References

External links 
Official Japan Website
Official Fancafe

Musical quartets
South Korean pop rock music groups
Musical groups established in 2013
English-language singers from South Korea
K-pop music groups
South Korean boy bands
FNC Entertainment artists
2013 establishments in South Korea